Deal with It is an American comedy television game show series that debuted on July 17, 2013, and airs weekly on TBS. The series features stand-up comic Theo Von, as he and a guest comedian dare people to pull pranks on the public. On August 20, 2013, TBS renewed Deal with It for a 12 episode second season. Season 2 premiered on March 19, 2014.
On May 22, 2014, TBS renewed Deal with It for a 10-episode third season, which premiered on October 24, 2014. The Deal with It format was created by Israeli Keshet Broadcasting and has been sold 14 times.

Series overview

Episodes

Season 1 (2013)

Season 2 (2014)

Season 3 (2014)

International versions

References

External links

2013 American television series debuts
2014 American television series endings
2010s American comedy game shows
English-language television shows
TBS (American TV channel) original programming
American hidden camera television series
American television series based on Israeli television series
Television series by Lionsgate Television